Vincaid is a settlement (hamlet) in the municipality of Kikinda, Republic of Serbia. It is officially classified as part of the village of Banatska Topola.
Located near the Kikinda-Zrenjanin road, the settlement was at first the estate of a family from which it got its name. Between the two world wars, the government made a futile attempt to turn this hamlet into a settlement of 120 households.

References
Brane Marijanović et al. Kikinda: istorija, kultura, sela, privreda, sport, turizam, Novi Sad: Prometej, 2002.

Kikinda